Lordotinae is a small subfamily of bee flies in the family Bombyliidae. This subfamily was formerly considered a tribe of Bombyliinae, but was elevated to subfamily as a result of research published in 2019.

Genera
These three genera belong to the subfamily Lordotinae:
 Geminaria Coquillett, 1894
 Lordotus Loew, 1863
 Othniomyia Hesse, 1938

References

External links

 

Bombyliidae